Michel Jean Legrand (24 February 1932 – 26 January 2019) was a French musical composer, arranger, conductor, and jazz pianist. Legrand was a prolific composer, having written over 200 film and television scores, in addition to many songs. His scores for two of the films of French New Wave director Jacques Demy, The Umbrellas of Cherbourg (1964) and The Young Girls of Rochefort (1967), earned Legrand his first Academy Award nominations. Legrand won his first Oscar for the song "The Windmills of Your Mind" from The Thomas Crown Affair (1968), and additional Oscars for Summer of '42 (1971) and Barbra Streisand's Yentl (1983).

Life and career
Legrand was born in Paris to his father, Raymond Legrand, who was himself a conductor and composer, and his mother, Marcelle Ter-Mikaëlian, who was the sister of conductor Jacques Hélian. Raymond and Marcelle were married in 1929. His maternal grandfather was Armenian.

Legrand composed more than two hundred film and television scores. He won three Oscars and five Grammys. He studied music at the Conservatoire de Paris from age 11, working with, among others, Nadia Boulanger and graduated with top honors as both a composer and a pianist. He burst upon the international music scene at 22 when his album I Love Paris (album) became a surprise hit. He established his name in the United States by working with such jazz stars as Miles Davis and Stan Getz. His sister Christiane Legrand was a member of The Swingle Singers and his niece Victoria Legrand is a member of the dream pop band Beach House.

Legrand composed music for Jacques Demy's films The Umbrellas of Cherbourg (1964) and The Young Girls of Rochefort (1967), and appeared and performed in Agnès Varda's Cléo from 5 to 7 (1961). He also composed music for Joseph Losey's Eva (1962), The Thomas Crown Affair (1968) (which features "The Windmills of Your Mind"), Ice Station Zebra (1968), The Picasso Summer (1969), The Lady in the Car with Glasses and a Gun (1970), The Go-Between (1971), Summer of '42 (1971), Clint Eastwood's Breezy (1973), The Three Musketeers (1973), Orson Welles's last-completed film F for Fake (1974), TriStar Pictures 1998 family film Madeline, and would later compose the score for Welles's posthumously released movie The Other Side of the Wind (2018). He also composed the score for Yentl (1983), as well as the film score for Louis Malle's film Atlantic City (1980). His instrumental version of the theme from Brian's Song charted 56th in 1972 on the Billboard's pop chart.

Legrand died of sepsis, during the night of 25–26 January 2019, at the American Hospital of Paris in Neuilly-sur-Seine, where he had been hospitalized for two weeks for a pulmonary infection. His funeral was held in Paris at the Alexander Nevsky Cathedral on 1 February 2019. He was interred at the Père Lachaise Cemetery. He remained active until his death and had concerts scheduled to take place in the spring.

Musical theatre
In 1997, Legrand composed the score for the musical Le Passe-muraille, with a book by Didier Van Cauwelaert. It premiered on Broadway in 2002 as Amour and was translated into English by Jeremy Sams and was directed by James Lapine. This musical was his Broadway debut and he was nominated for a Tony Award in 2003 for Best Score. Later he recorded Legrand Affair with Melissa Errico, a 100-piece symphony orchestra that included songs with lyrics by Alan and Marilyn Bergman.

The world premiere of the new musical Marguerite from Alain Boublil and Claude-Michel Schönberg, the creators of Les Misérables and Miss Saigon, included music by Michel Legrand and lyrics by Herbert Kretzmer. Marguerite is set during World War II in occupied Paris, and was inspired by the romantic novel La Dame aux Camélias by Alexandre Dumas fils. It premiered in May 2008 at the Haymarket Theatre, London and was directed by Jonathan Kent.

Discography

Awards

Legrand has won three Oscars (from 13 nominations), five Grammys, and was nominated for an Emmy. His first Academy Award win was in 1969 for the song "The Windmills of Your Mind", followed with the Academy Award for his music for Summer of ’42 in 1972 and for Yentl in 1984.

Following are a selection of the awards and nominations with which Legrand's works have been honored:

Academy Award awards and nominations
Source: AllMovie

 Best Original Score, Substantially Original Score: The Umbrellas of Cherbourg (1965) - nominated
 Best Original Score for a Motion Picture (not a Musical): The Thomas Crown Affair (1968)  - nominated
 Best Original Song Score and Its Adaptation or Best Adaptation Score: The Young Girls of Rochefort (1968) - nominated
 Best Original Dramatic Score: Summer of '42 (1971) - won
 Best Original Song Score and Its Adaptation or Best Adaptation Score: Yentl (1983) - won
 Best Original Song:
 "I Will Wait for You" from The Umbrellas of Cherbourg (1965) - nominated
 "The Windmills of Your Mind" from The Thomas Crown Affair (1968) - won
 "What Are You Doing the Rest of Your Life?" from The Happy Ending (1969) - nominated
 "Pieces of Dreams" from Pieces of Dreams (1970) - nominated
 "How Do You Keep the Music Playing?" from Best Friends (1982) - nominated
 "Papa, Can You Hear Me?"  from Yentl (1983) - nominated
"The Way He Makes Me Feel" from Yentl (1983) - nominated

Golden Globe awards and nominations
Source: All Movie

 Original Score:
 The Thomas Crown Affair (1968)
 The Happy Ending (1969)
 Wuthering Heights (1970)
 Le Mans (1971)
 Summer of '42 (1971)
 Lady Sings the Blues (1972)
 Breezy (1973)
 Yentl (1983)
 Original Song:
 "The Windmills of Your Mind" from The Thomas Crown Affair (1968) (won)
 "What are You Doing the Rest of Your Life?" from The Happy Ending (1969)
 "Pieces of Dreams" from Pieces of Dreams (1970)
 "Breezy's Song" from Breezy (1973)
 "Yesterday's Dreams" from Falling in Love Again (1980)
 "The Way He Makes Me Feel" from Yentl (1983)

Grammy Award awards and nominations
Source: Grammy.com

Best Instrumental Composition: "Theme from Summer of '42 (The Summer Knows)" (1971) - win
Best Instrumental Arrangement: "Theme From Summer Of '42" (1971) - nomination
Best Pop Instrumental Performance: "Theme From Summer Of '42" (1971) - nomination
 Best arrangement accompanying vocalist: What Are You Doing the Rest of Your Life? (Sarah Vaughan) (1972) - win
 Song of the year: "The Summer Knows" from Summer of '42 (1972) - nomination
 Best Arrangement Accompanying Vocalist(s): "The Summer Knows" (1972) - nomination
 Best instrumental composition: "Brian's Song" [TV] (1972) - win
 Album of Best Original Score Written for a Motion Picture or Television Special: The Three Musketeers (1974) - nomination
 Best Instrumental Composition: "Images" (1975) win
 Best Jazz Performance by a Big Band: "Images" (1975) win
 Best Album of Original Score Written for a Motion Picture or a Television Special: Yentl (1984) - nomination
 Best Instrumental Arrangement Accompanying Vocals: Yentl (Barbra Streisand) (1984) - nomination
Best Instrumental Arrangement Accompanying Vocals: "Nature Boy" (track from "Unforgettable") (1991) - nomination
Best Instrumental Arrangement: "Where Or When" (Track from: "Happy Radio Days", Erato Records) (1998) - nomination

Theatre nominations
 Tony Award for Best Original Score: Amour (2002)
 Drama Desk Award for Outstanding Music and Outstanding Orchestrations: Amour (2002)

Emmy Award nominations
 Outstanding Achievement in Music Composition for a Limited Series or a Special (Dramatic Underscore): A Woman Called Golda [TV] (1982)

Fennecus nominations
 Song score, original or adaptation: Yentl (1983)
 Original song: "The Way He Makes Me Feel" from Yentl (1983)

Apex nominations
 Original score, comedy: Best Friends (1982)
 Original song, drama: "The Way He Makes Me Feel" from Yentl (1983)
 Original song score/adaptation/compilation, drama: Yentl (1983)

Australian Film Institute Award
 Best Original Music Score: Dingo (1991) win

Prix Moliere Award
 Best musical (1997): Le Passe-Muraille (French stage version of Amour)

ASCAP
 Henry Mancini Award, awarded by ASCAP, for Le Passe-Muraille (1998)

Golden Eagle Award
 Golden Eagle Award: Outstanding contribution to world cinema (2002)

Others 
 In 2018, asteroid 31201 Michellegrand was named in his honour.

Documentary 
"Michel Legrand, let the music play", directed by Gregory Monro in 2018

References

External links

 Michel Legrand at the British Film Institute

 Interview with Michel Legrand at the Press Launch for Margeruite in London UK

 
1932 births
2019 deaths
20th-century French conductors (music)
20th-century French male musicians
21st-century French conductors (music)
21st-century French male musicians
Best Original Music Score Academy Award winners
Best Original Music BAFTA Award winners
Best Original Song Academy Award-winning songwriters
Burials at Père Lachaise Cemetery
Broadway composers and lyricists
Columbia Records artists
Conservatoire de Paris alumni
Deaths from sepsis
Easy listening musicians
French expatriates in the United States
French film score composers
French jazz composers
French jazz pianists
French male conductors (music)
French male film score composers
French male pianists
French music arrangers
French musical theatre composers
French people of Armenian descent
Golden Globe Award-winning musicians
Grammy Award winners
Jazz arrangers
Male jazz composers
Male jazz pianists
Male musical theatre composers
Musicians from Paris
Philips Records artists
Prix Benois de la Danse winners
RCA Victor artists